Ralph Michael Beckett (born June 1971) is a British racehorse trainer who specialises in training horses for Flat racing. He is based at Kimpton, Hampshire.

Beckett comes from an aristocratic racing background. He is the grandson of Ralph Beckett, 3rd Baron Grimthorpe, whose horse Fortina won the 1947 Cheltenham Gold Cup, and cousin to racehorse manager Edward Beckett, 5th Baron Grimthorpe.
After gaining experience with various trainers around the world, Beckett became assistant trainer to Peter Walwyn in Lambourn. In 2000 he took over the yard after Walwyn's retirement.

Beckett achieved his first Group 1 win in 2008 when Look Here won the Epsom Oaks. Further classic success came with Talent in the 2013 Oaks, Simple Verse in the 2015 St Leger Stakes and Westover in the 2022 Irish Derby.

Beckett was elected president of the National Trainers Federation for 2022/2023.

Major wins 
 Great Britain

 British Champions Fillies and Mares Stakes - (1) - Simple Verse (2015) 
 British Champions Sprint Stakes - (1) -  Kinross (2022) 
 Cheveley Park Stakes - (1) - Lezoo (2022)
 Epsom Oaks - (2) - Look Here (2008), Talent (2013)
 St Leger Stakes - (1) - Simple Verse (2015)

 France
 Critérium International - (1) - Angel Bleu (2021)
 Prix de la Forêt - (1) - Kinross (2022)
 Prix Jean-Luc Lagardère - (1) - Angel Bleu (2021)
 Prix Royal-Oak - (1) - Scope (2021)

 Ireland
 Irish Derby - (1) - Westover (2022)

References 

1971 births
Living people
British racehorse trainers
Ralph